2015 Men's Volleyball Thai-Denmark Super League was the 2nd edition of the tournament. It was held at the MCC Hall of The Mall Ngamwongwan in Nonthaburi, Thailand from 26 – 30 March 2015.

Teams
 Kasetsart
 Chonburi E-Tech Air Force
 Wing 46 Toyota-Phitsanulok
 Nakhon Ratchasima
 Cosmo Ching Rai
 Krungkao Air Force

Pools composition

Preliminary round

Pool A

|}

|}

Pool B

|}

|}

Final round

Semifinals

|}

Final

|}

Final standing

See also 
 2015 Women's Volleyball Thai-Denmark Super League

References
 Schedule (Archived 2017-03-11)

Men's Thai-Denmark Super League
Men's,2015
Volleyball,Men's Thai-Denmark Super League